Tyrone M. Williams Jr. (born October 22, 1972) is a former gridiron football defensive tackle. He was signed by the Chicago Bears as an undrafted free agent in 1997.  He played college football at Wyoming.

Williams has also played for the Philadelphia Eagles, Kansas City Chiefs, Washington Redskins, BC Lions and Winnipeg Blue Bombers.  He was a two-time Western Division All-Star and won the 94th Grey Cup with the Lions.

External links
BC Lions bio

1972 births
Living people
American football defensive ends
American football defensive tackles
American players of Canadian football
BC Lions players
Canadian football defensive linemen
Chicago Bears players
Kansas City Chiefs players
Philadelphia Eagles players
Players of American football from Philadelphia
Players of Canadian football from Philadelphia
Washington Redskins players
Winnipeg Blue Bombers players
Wyoming Cowboys football players